The 2020 Pan American Weightlifting Championships were held in Santo Domingo, Dominican Republic from 19 to 24 April 2021.

Medal summary

Men

Women

Medal table
Ranking by Big (Total result) medals

Ranking by all medals: Big (Total result) and Small (Snatch and Clean & Jerk)

Team ranking

Men

Women

References

External links
Results

Pan American Weightlifting Championships
Pan American Weightlifting Championships
Pan American Weightlifting Championships
International weightlifting competitions hosted by the Dominican Republic
Sports competitions in Santo Domingo
Pan American Weightlifting Championships